Saint Walker is a fictional comic book character appearing in American comic books and other associated media published by DC Comics. He is an alien member of the galactic Blue Lantern Corps, an organization dedicated to spreading peace and harmony through the power of hope throughout the universe.

Publication history
Saint Walker first appeared in Green Lantern (vol. 4) #25 and was created by Geoff Johns and Ethan Van Sciver.

Character history
Walker is a priest living on the planet of Astonia with a wife and two children. Astonia is doomed, as its ancient sun is dying. Saint Walker manages to calm his despairing people and give them hope in the face of extinction, which causes a power ring to choose him as a member of the Blue Lantern Corps, stating that he "has the ability to instill great hope". With his ring, he sets his sun's age back 8.9 billion years, thereby saving his home planet.

Saint Walker and his fellow Blue Lanterns are first introduced in the midst of the Final Crisis event as part of the build-up to the Blackest Night storyline. During the Final Crisis, Hal Jordan and John Stewart of the Green Lantern Corps are ambushed by the Red Lantern Corps, who take the rogue former Green Lantern Sinestro from their custody. Jordan is injured during the conflict, and his wounds are healed when he first comes into contact with Saint Walker.

In the Blackest Night storyline, having joined Hal Jordan's and Indigo-1's efforts to rally one member of each Corps to attempt to destroy the Black Lantern power battery, Saint Walker agrees to use his power ring to ease Larfleeze's hunger while they work together. When deputizing an Earth hero to assist in the current crisis until the rest of the Blue Lantern Corps can arrive, Walker's ring selects Barry Allen as a temporary Blue Lantern. After Nekron is defeated, Walker works with Carol Ferris to heal Mera of the influence of her red power ring.

In Justice League of America (vol. 2) #55 (2011), the character joins the titular team in battling Eclipso, and attempts to assist the resurrected Hank Henshaw against Doomsday on Batman's orders.

In the War of the Green Lanterns storyline, Saint Walker and the rest of the New Guardians make their way to the planet Ryut. Krona and the Emotional Entities are nowhere to be found but the group does come upon the Book of the Black. When former Sinestro Corps member Lyssa Drak appears, she quickly subdues the New Guardians, trapping all but Hal in the Book of the Black. Hal escapes with the rings of the New Guardians, later passing Walker's ring on to Kyle Rayner when Krona infects the Central Power Battery with Parallax to bring the Green Lantern Corps under his influence. In the final battle Saint Walker is freed from the book by Kyle, his blue ring returns to him and the Guardians of the Universe then teleport him back to Odym. Afterwards, Saint Walker returns to Oa to restore Ganthet's missing hand.

The New 52
In the new series Green Lantern: New Guardians, Saint Walker assisted Kyle Rayner when he became a "magnet" for other power rings, helping Kyle escape the attacks of the other four Corps members who had tracked the rings. They travel to Oa to try to seek the aid of the Guardians. This plan backfires when it is revealed that Ganthet has been stripped of his emotions by the other Guardians, to the extent that he attacks Walker when Walker tries to help Kyle directly after he is briefly overwhelmed by the rings. Ganthet proclaims that the Blue Lantern Corps were a mistake that he will now rectify. After they are forced to escape the Guardians, Walker heals Arkillo's severed tongue using an illusion of Sinestro. However, in the subsequent confrontation with Archangel Invictus, Walker is unable to heal Invictus' anger at the Lanterns, although his actions do help Invictus see that the Lanterns are not completely tainted. Returning to Odym to regroup after Invictus releases the New Guardians only if they agree to kill Larfleeze, Walker learns that Odym is being attacked by the Reach, enemies of all ring-wielders, forcing him to call the other New Guardians for help when he attempts to teach the other Blue Lanterns how to channel their auras to increase their offensive capabilities so that they can fight on their own. Although he and the other New Guardians aid Kyle against Invictus, the team splits up after learning that Sayd was responsible for drawing the rings to Kyle as part of a plan to assemble a team to save Ganthet, feeling that her actions have tainted the team before it began, regardless of her motives in bringing them together.

Following the defeat of the Third Army and the fall of the Guardians, the Blue Lantern Corps relocated to the planet Elpis, but were soon attacked by the cosmic entity known as Relic, who sought to rid the universe of its ostensible "lightsmiths", as he considers it the only way to keep the universe safe. The rest of the Blue Lantern Corps were destroyed, leaving only Walker as he was taken to safety by Kyle Rayner, Carol Ferris and the Templar Guardians while Elpis was devastated by Relic's assault. Although Walker eventually recovered on Mogo, after learning of Relic's revelations that there was only a limited amount of power in the emotional reservoir that powered the rings and the destruction of the other Blue Lanterns, Walker's depression caused his ring to abandon him, Walker accepting that it was probably for the best as the power of the blue rings could drain the reservoir further. He later regained his hope, and his ring, after witnessing Kyle Rayner's White Lantern abilities on New Genesis, confident that the emotional reservoir could be refilled in the future.

DC Rebirth
In the DC Rebirth title Hal Jordan and the Green Lantern Corps, Saint Walker appears on an unknown planet, and is engaged in battle with hostile aliens when Hal Jordan and Kyle Rayner arrive. After they destroy the hostile aliens, Hal and Kyle ask Saint Walker to join them in meeting with Ganthet and Sayd. Saint Walker arrives at the new base of the Green Lantern Corps on Mogo, and is reunited with the sentient planet. Later, Ganthet and Sayd test Saint Walker, attempting to form a psionic link with Kyle's White Lantern power, as they believe that this could bring about the resurrection of the Blue Lantern Corps, but they are prevented from doing so, though Saint Walker experiences visions of an unknown presence.

Powers and abilities
Saint Walker possesses a blue power ring which is fueled by the emotion hope. While hope is the most powerful of the seven emotions, he must be near an active Green Lantern's power ring to tap into his own ring's full power. Otherwise, the rings are only capable of the default abilities of flight and a protective aura. This is due to the fact that the power of hope is nothing without the willpower to act on it. Blue rings must be fueled by true hope to operate at their users' command.

While under the influence of a nearby green power ring, Saint Walker can heal wounds. The ring's power can be supplemented with the hope of other living beings; for instance, Saint Walker and Warth were able to reduce a dying sun's age by 8.6 billion years because of the hope emanating from the inhabitants of a nearby planet. A blue ring can negatively impact the performance of rings on the opposite side of the emotional spectrum. During his initial meeting with the JLA, Saint Walker discovered that his abilities can also be augmented by proximity to Starman (Mikaal Tomas).

As the first and most experienced Blue Lantern, Walker has shown the ability to channel his aura to increase his strength and hold his own in a fight against many adversaries.

In other media

Television

 Saint Walker appears in Green Lantern: The Animated Series, voiced by Phil Morris. In the episode "Lost Planet", he is introduced as a hermit living on Mogo, a sentient planet that traps evildoers. He encounters Razer, a former member of the Red Lantern Corps, and tries to convince him to turn away from the path of violence he currently walks. Despite his peaceful demeanor, Walker is portrayed as a very agile and adept fighter, capable of disarming Razer in hand-to-hand combat without the use of a power ring. Although in possession of a green power ring, he declines joining the Corps, believing that his own destiny lies elsewhere. During "Invasion", Saint Walker talks to Mogo about what his role is in the Red Lantern invasion (as Mogo saved him and told him there is a beacon of hope that can stop the Red Lanterns) so Mogo tells him that he must climb to the highest peak of the sentient planet. As he climbs, he witnesses Atrocitus recruit one of the prisoners Mogo kept on his surface. Saint Walker wanted to exact revenge on them after they destroyed his homeworld but Mogo insisted that they were not important at that time. Once he reached the peak, he asked Mogo where the beacon was and while he thought that the empty peak was a message that there was no hope, he refused to believe that, that was the case. After Saint Walker vows to stop the Red Lantern Corps, and set the world to right, Hal Jordan's Green Lantern power battery (now a Blue Lantern power battery thanks to Ganthet) presents Saint Walker with a Blue Power Ring and the role of being both the leader of the Blue lantern Corps and the universe's last hope. In the season finale, Saint Walker (now a Blue Lantern), along with Mogo, aid Kilowog in the final stand against the Red Lantern fleet of ships. Saint Walker has also appeared in the second season of the animated series, in an episode that takes place on Odym, alongside Ganthet and the second Blue Lantern, Brother Warth. Hal Jordan and Kilowog travel to Odym with a damaged Manhunter to contact Ganthet, the only Guardian that Hal Jordan trusts, to learn more about the Manhunter robots. They discover that Red Lantern Razer has been living on Odym, trying to bring his rage under control. Ganthet explains the origin of the Manhunters, but his priority is in igniting the Blue Lantern Power Battery. Doing so not only reactivates the damaged Manhunter, but as the power of the Blue Lantern battery sweeps across space, it attracts other Manhunters to Odym. Although the combined forces of Jordan, Kilowog, Saint Walker, Warth, and Razer are able to defeat the Manhunters, Ganthet determines that the Blue Lantern battery must be shut down until the Manhunters are dealt with permanently.
 A mental institution called St. Walker's Hospital is mentioned in the Arrow second-season episode entitled "Blast Radius". St. Walker's is a mental institution in which Brother Blood's mother resides. Laurel Lance becomes suspicious of Blood and tracks the woman down to the institute with the idea that it's Blood's aunt, but finds out that she is in fact Blood's mother. Blood himself later comes and kills his mother in the following episode "Blind Spot" and this forces Laurel to go to Arrow for help.

Miscellaneous
 Saint Walker is featured in the Smallville Season 11 digital comic based on the TV series.
 In Arrow tie-in comic Arrow: Season 2.5, St. Walker's church is a name of a defunct orphanage that is used as a base of operations for the Church of Blood in Star City, led by a new Brother Blood. It is abandoned after his death.

Video games
 Saint Walker appears in DC Universe Online.
 Saint Walker appears as a playable character in Lego Batman 3: Beyond Gotham, voiced by Sam Riegel.

References

DC Comics aliens
DC Comics characters with accelerated healing
DC Comics extraterrestrial superheroes
DC Comics superheroes
Green Lantern characters
Characters created by Geoff Johns
Comics characters introduced in 2007
Characters created by Ethan Van Sciver